General elections were held in Malta between 11 and 13 June 1932. The Nationalist Party emerged as the largest party, winning 21 of the 32 seats in the Legislative Assembly and five of the seven elected seats in the Senate.

Electoral system
Members of the Legislative Assembly were elected using the single transferable vote system, whilst suffrage was limited to men meeting certain property qualifications.

Results

Legislative Assembly

Senate

References

General elections in Malta
Malta
General election
Maltese general election
Election and referendum articles with incomplete results
Maltese general election